Agonidium nidicola is a species of ground beetle in the subfamily Platyninae. It was described by Jeannel in 1951.

References

nidicola
Beetles described in 1951